The Bild Lilli doll was a German fashion doll launched on August 12, 1955, and produced until 1964. Its design was based on the comic-strip character Lilli, created by Reinhard Beuthien for the German tabloid newspaper Bild. The doll was made of polystyrene, came in two sizes, and had an available wardrobe of 1950s fashion. The Lilli doll was copied, and altered to some degree, for Mattel upon the direction of that company's co-founder, Ruth Handler. Mattel acquired the rights to Bild Lilli in 1964, and production of the German doll ceased, in favor of Mattel's new vinyl doll, which they called Barbie.

History
Lilli was a German cartoon character created by Reinhard Beuthien for the German tabloid Bild. In 1953, the newspaper decided to market a Lilli doll and contacted Max Weissbrodt of the toy company O&M Hausser in Neustadt bei Coburg. Weissbrodt designed a prototype doll based on Beuthien's cartoons, which was sold from 1955 to 1964; that year Mattel acquired the rights to the doll and German production stopped. Approximately 130,000 were produced. Today Lilli is a collector's piece and commands prices up to several thousand euros, depending on condition, packaging and clothes. In the Coburg Doll Museum, over 1,000 historic dolls are displayed, including the Lilli doll, the "grandmother" of the world-famous Barbie.

Cartoon
Ordered to draw a "filler" cartoon for the June 24, 1952, inaugural issue of Bild, Reinhard Beuthien drew an unruly baby making a mess in her house; his editor disliked it, so he adapted the drawing into a sexy pony-tailed blonde sitting in a fortune-teller's tent. She was asking, "Can't you give me the name and address of this tall, handsome, rich man?" The cartoon was an immediate success and became a daily feature.

Lilli was post-war, sassy, and ambitious, "a golddigger, exhibitionist, and floozy". The cartoon always consisted of a picture of Lilli talking, while dressed or undressed in a manner that showed her figure, usually to girlfriends, boyfriends, or her boss. To a policeman who told her that two-piece swimsuits are banned in the street: "Oh, and in your opinion, what part should I take off?" The last Lilli cartoon appeared on January 5, 1961.

Doll
She held three patents, features absolutely new in doll-making: the head and neck were not one form connected with a seam at the shoulders, but rather the seam was mid-neck, behind the chin; the hair was not rooted, but a cut-out scalp that was attached by a hidden metal screw; the legs did not sprawl open when she was sitting. The doll was made of plastic and had molded eyelashes, pale skin and a painted face with side glancing eyes, high narrow eyebrows and red lips. Her fingernails were also painted red. She wore her hair in a ponytail with one curl on the forehead. Her shoes and earrings were molded on. Her limbs were attached inside by coated rubber bands. The cartoon Lilli was blonde, but a few of the dolls had other hair colours. Each Lilli doll carried a miniature copy of Bild and was sold in a clear plastic tube, with the doll's feet fitted into the base of a stand labelled "Bild-Lilli" that formed the bottom of the tube; the packaging was designed by E. Martha Maar, the mother-in-law of the Hausser company owner.

Originally the tall dolls cost DM 12, the small DM 7.50 at a time when average monthly take-home pay was DM 200 to DM 400. As this price suggests, the dolls were marketed to adults, mainly men, as a joke or gag gift at tobacconists, kiosks and newsagents that normally sold flowers, chocolates and other small giftware. A German brochure from the 1950s states that Lilli was "always discreet", and that her wardrobe made her "the star of every bar", and an advertisement from the 1960s encouraged young men to give their girlfriends a Lilli doll as a gift, rather than flowers. (This latter advert was then referenced by a Lilli newspaper cartoon, where Lilli says to her boyfriend: "I found it so apt that you gave me a Lilli doll as a present – now, I've a similarly suitable present for you" while presenting him with a puppet).

A total of 130,000 were made. The doll eventually became popular with children, too. Dollhouses, room settings, furniture, and other toy accessories to scale with the small Lilli were produced by German toy factories to cash in on her popularity amongst children and parents.

Lilli came as a dressed doll—additional fashions were sold separately. Her fashions, mostly also designed by Maar, mirror the lifestyle of the 1950s: She had outfits for parties, the beach and tennis, as well as cotton dresses, pajamas and poplin suits. In her last years, her wardrobe consisted mainly of traditional "dirndl" dresses. Lilli's dresses always have patent fasteners marked "PRYM".

Lilli and her fashions were sold as children's toys in several European countries, including Italy and Scandinavian countries; outside Germany she is usually remembered as a children's doll. In the United States, she was just called "Lilli". Some Lillis have been seen in original 1950s packaging for an English-speaking market labelled "Lili Marleen", after the song.

Film
A film about Lilli was released in Germany in 1958:  (Lilli, a Girl From the Big City), a comedy-mystery directed by Hermann Leitner. A contest was held to choose the star; the winner was the Danish actress Ann Smyrner.

Imitations and Barbie
Several toy companies (mainly in Hong Kong) produced dolls resembling Bild Lilli, some from purchased original molds. Also in Spain, Muñecas FEJ (Guillen y Vicedo) copied the molds and made a very similar doll, but with darker skin, white earrings and articulated waist. However, Spanish society was extremely conservative at the time, and was not ready for such "offensive" dolls. Mothers were not buying them for their daughters and the manufacturer had to retire them from the market.

Mattel's Barbie doll, which appeared in March 1959, was based on Bild Lilli dolls that co-founder Ruth Handler had acquired in Hamburg. The first Barbie doll was made of vinyl instead of hard plastic, had rooted hair with curly bangs rather than a wig-cap, included separate shoes and earrings which were not molded on as Lilli's were. However, apart from these differences, the earliest Barbie dolls were in many ways quite similar to Lilli in overall shape and appearance.

Louis Marx and Company acquired the rights to the Bild Lilli doll from Hausser and sold Miss Seventeen and smaller Miss Marlene dolls. Mattel had bought all patents and copyrights to the Bild Lilli doll so that using that name as a book title or product name would infringe copyright laws. Marx unsuccessfully attempted to sue Mattel for patent infringement.

Related characters
In 1962, Beuthien created another cartoon character called "Schwabinchen" for a Bavarian newspaper, but it was not as successful as Lilli and the dolls inspired by her were of poor quality.  Later he started "Gigi", who had even less success and never became a doll.

References

Further reading 
Knaak, Silke. Deutsche Modepuppen der 50er und 60er Jahre (German fashion dolls of the Fifties and Sixties); 2005; available at Barbies.de. German and English.
Warnecke, Dieter. Barbie im Wandel der Jahrzehnte; Heyne 1995. . German.
Metzger, Wolfram (Ed.): 40 Jahre Barbie-World; Info Verlag 1998. . German.
"Rolf Hausser's Story" (Interview in the magazine Barbie Bazaar, February 2000).

Fashion dolls
Products introduced in 1955